The  is a toll road in Kyoto Prefecture and Shiga Prefecture. The highway serves as an alternative to Japan National Route 1 and the Meishin Expressway by bypassing Kyoto to the south of the city. It is owned and operated by the West Nippon Expressway Company (NEXCO West Japan). The route is signed E88 under Ministry of Land, Infrastructure, Transport and Tourism's  "2016 Proposal for Realization of Expressway Numbering."

Route description
 The Keiji Bypass is a four-lane dual-carriageway that begins at Seta-higashi Junction in the city of Ōtsu in Shiga Prefecture. From here it curves to the southwest to bypass Kyoto. It goes through several tunnels as it crosses in to Kyoto Prefecture. To the south of Kyoto, it is paralleled by National Route 1 and further to the west, National Route 478. Its western terminus is at the Meishin Expressway to the southwest of Kyoto. The roadway of the Keiji Bypass continues on to the northwest as the Kyoto Jūkan Expressway.

The entire route has a speed limit of 80 km/h.

Junction list
The Keiji Bypass is a direct extension of National Route 1.
TB= Toll booth

|colspan="8" style="text-align: center;"|Through to  Kyoto Jūkan Expressway

See also

Japan National Route 1
Japan National Route 478

References

External links

West Nippon Expressway Company

Toll roads in Japan
Roads in Kyoto Prefecture
Roads in Shiga Prefecture